The Infant Mental Health Journal is a quarterly peer-reviewed academic journal covering developmental psychology. It was established in 1980 and is published by Wiley-Blackwell. It is the official journal of the World Association for Infant Mental Health. The editor-in-chief is Paul Spicer (University of Oklahoma). According to the Journal Citation Reports, the journal has a 2017 impact factor of 1.673, ranking it 47th out of 73 journals in the category "Psychology, Developmental".

See also

Child psychotherapy
Pregnancy
Prenatal and perinatal psychology

References

External links

Developmental psychology journals
Wiley-Blackwell academic journals
Publications established in 1980
Quarterly journals
English-language journals
Academic journals associated with learned and professional societies